Pudimadaka or Pudi Madaka is a Neighbourhood area in Achutapuram mandal of Anakapalli district, Andhra Pradesh, India.

Pudimadaka Lighthouse
There is a Lighthouse at Pudimadaka village. It was first time commissioned in 1971 and renovated in 1991. The lighthouse was on a masonry tower of 26 meters height. It has a visible range of 27 Nautical miles.

References

Neighbourhoods in Visakhapatnam
Populated coastal places in India